was a Japanese actor, singer, and model affiliated with Stardust Promotion. After modeling in various campaigns, he made his acting debut in the 2004 television series Water Boys 2 and later appeared as Fumizō Sōma from Tadashii Ōji no Tsukurikata, Shōzō Akaike from the Takumi-kun film adaptation series, and Akira Hayase from Kamen Rider Drive.

In addition to television and film projects, Takiguchi has appeared in multiple stage plays. He played Shuichiro Oishi in Musical: The Prince of Tennis (2006). After leaving production, Takiguchi played the roles of Yūzō Kashima in Mankai Stage: A3! and Miroku in InuYasha. In addition to acting, Takiguchi was part of the project boy band PureBoys from 2007 to 2008.

Career 
Takiguchi attended an all-boys high school, and, during his senior year, he was scouted to become a model. Takiguchi accepted the offer, after concluding that the job would be more rewarding than "graduating out of college to become a salaryman." He was signed on to Stardust Promotion in Section 3. In 2004, he debuted as an actor in the television series Water Boys 2.

From 2006 to 2007, Takiguchi played Shuichiro Oishi in Musical: The Prince of Tennis. In June 2007, Takiguchi became a member of the project group PureBoys. In March 2008, he announced he was leaving the group and continued to make appearances on their online show until June 27, 2008.

His final appearance before his death was in the musical Seishun Aoharu Tetsudō, which ended its run on November 4, 2019.

Personal life

Takiguchi's father is a chef. In December 2008, Takiguchi became a certified chef.

Death

Takiguchi died from heart failure on November 13, 2019, at the age of 34. Prior to his death, Takiguchi had been preparing to appear in the stage plays Meijiza no Hen: Kirin ni No-ru in December 2019 and Mankai Stage: A3! August 2020 in January 2020. Takiguchi's funeral was held privately with close relatives.

Discography

Soundtrack appearances

Filmography

TV series

Theatre

Movies

Radio/Webcast

PVs

References

External links 
 

Japanese male actors
1985 births
2019 deaths
Stardust Promotion artists